Susan Porter Benson (July 26, 1943 – June 20, 2005) was an American historian and academic, specializing in labor history and women's studies as well as public and cultural history. She taught at Bristol Community College (1968–86), the University of Missouri (1986–93), and the University of Connecticut (1993–2005). Her book Counter Cultures influenced the field of labor and women's history and consumer culture. Presenting the Past: Essays on History and the Public, which she co-edited with Stephen Brier and Roy Rosenzweig, inspired the Temple University Press book series Critical Perspectives on the Past.

A native of Washington, Pennsylvania, Benson received her BA degree from Simmons College in 1964, her MA from Brown University in 1968, and her PhD from Brown in 1983. She taught as a visiting professor at the University of Warwick (1984) and Yale University (1998) and served as director of women's studies at the University of Connecticut from 1993 to 1998. 

Benson served on the editorial boards of Labor History, Journal of American History, American Quarterly, Gender & History, and Radical History Review. She also served on committees of the Organization of American Historians, Berkshire Conference on the History of Women, Labor and Working-Class History Association, and Rhode Island Committee for the Humanities.

Benson died of cancer in Manchester, Connecticut, at the age of 61.

Published books

References

External links 
Finding aid to Susan Porter Benson Papers at the University of Connecticut

1943 births
2005 deaths
People from Washington, Pennsylvania
Simmons University alumni
Brown University alumni
American women historians
20th-century American historians
Historians of the United States
University of Connecticut faculty
University of Missouri faculty
Historians of Connecticut
Labor historians
Women's historians
Public historians